Desinić is a village and municipality in the Krapina-Zagorje County in Croatia. At the 2011 census, there was a total population of 2,951.

Notable people 
 Veronika of Desenice, the second wife of Frederick II, Count of Celje, is traditionally believed to had been born in Desinić. 
 Gaudencija Šplajt, Roman Catholic nun, social worker and martyr

See also
 Veliki Tabor Castle

References

Populated places in Krapina-Zagorje County
Municipalities of Croatia